The 2007 Saskatchewan Scotties Tournament of Hearts women's provincial curling championship, was held January 31 to February 4 at the Balgonie Curling Club in Balgonie, Saskatchewan. The winning team of Jan Betker, represented Saskatchewan at the 2007 Scotties Tournament of Hearts in Lethbridge, Alberta, where they finished round robin with a 9-2 record, before losing the final to the defending champion, Team Canada, Kelly Scott

Teams

Standings

Results

Draw 1
January 31, 7:00 PM CT

Draw 2
February 1, 9:30 AM CT

Draw 3
February 1, 2:00 PM CT

Draw 4
February 2, 9:30 AM CT

Draw 5
February 2, 2:00 PM CT

Draw 6
February 2, 7:00 PM CT

Draw 7
February 3, 9:30 AM CT

Playoffs

Semifinal
February 3, 7:00 PM CT

Final
February 4, 2:00 PM CT

References

Saskatchewan Scotties Tournament Of Hearts, 2007
Curling in Saskatchewan
2007 in Saskatchewan